Antonia Christina Basilotta (born September 22, 1943), better known by her stage name Toni Basil, is an American singer, choreographer, dancer, actress, and director. Her song "Mickey" topped the charts in the US, Canada and Australia and hit the top ten in several other countries.

Early life
Basil was born Antonia Christina Basilotta on September 22, 1943, in Philadelphia, Pennsylvania, to Jacqueline Jessica Anderson, a vaudevillian acrobatic comedienne in her family's act Billy Wells and The Four Fays, and Louis Basilotta, an orchestra leader who conducted orchestras at the Chicago Theatre and at the Sahara Hotel and Casino in Las Vegas, among other locations. Basil has Italian ancestry.

She was raised in Las Vegas, Nevada, where her father moved the family for his work when she was a child. Basil graduated from Las Vegas High School in 1961, where she was a head cheerleader. Already known by the nickname "Toni", she later incorporated her cheerleading experience into her dance career, including her choreography/performance of "Mickey".  The cheerleader uniform that she wore in the video was the one she wore in high school.

Career

Dance career
Basil started dancing professionally in childhood, but her career started when she served as an assistant choreographer to David Winters and as a dancer on Shindig! a breakthrough music variety show that premiered on the ABC network in 1964. In addition, she was assistant choreographer and a dancer on the 1964 concert film The T.A.M.I. Show (Teen-Age Music International) choreographed by David Winters, which featured fellow dancer and friend Teri Garr. Her 1960s film choreography work includes Village of the Giants (1965), The Cool Ones (1967), and the Monkees' 1968 film Head in which she is partnered on-screen with Davy Jones during "Daddy's Song". She was a lead dancer in the 1964 beach party film Pajama Party, and a dancer in the Elvis Presley movie, Viva Las Vegas. She is credited as a choreographer for some episodes of The Carol Burnett Show.

In 1980, Basil choreographed, and co-directed with David Byrne, the music video for "Once in a Lifetime" by Talking Heads. She worked with Talking Heads again to direct and choreograph the video for the song "Crosseyed and Painless", taken from the same album Remain in Light. She choreographed David Bowie's Diamond Dogs Tour in 1974, his Glass Spider Tour in 1987, and his video for "Time Will Crawl" (1987). She has worked with Bette Midler for many years, including her 2008/2009 Las Vegas show The Showgirl Must Go On. She served as the associate director and choreographer of the worldwide Tina!: 50th Anniversary Tour in 2008/2009. Her expertise as a choreographer led her to be invited to sit as a guest judge on season four and five of Fox Broadcasting Company's So You Think You Can Dance? In addition, she is credited with bringing street dance to prominence as a founding member and manager of The Lockers.

Her film choreography through the 1970s, 1980s, 1990s, and 2000s include American Graffiti (1973), The Rose (1979), Peggy Sue Got Married (1986), Something to Talk About (1995), That Thing You Do (1996), My Best Friend's Wedding (1997), Legally Blonde (2001), Legally Blonde 2: Red, White & Blonde (2003), Charlie Wilson's War (2007), and The House Bunny (2008).

Basil is one of the seven original Lockers, the street dance group considered "the group that changed the face of dance". She is recognized as having been a seminal influence in bringing street dance to the attention of the American public. A 2012 Dance Magazine article cited Basil as the pioneer in merging ballet with street dance for a piece she choreographed for Saturday Night Live, "Swan Lake" in 1978.

The Lockers opened and toured with Frank Sinatra, including performances at Carnegie Hall.  They opened for Funkadelic at Radio City Music Hall and many acts in Las Vegas, and made countless television appearances including the third episode of Saturday Night Live.

Basil choreographed the TV Land Awards salute to Soul Train in 2005, as well as the TV Land Awards salute to Sid and Marty Krofft in 2009.

Basil choreographed Quentin Tarantino's 2019 film Once Upon a Time in Hollywood at the age of 75, and appeared in an uncredited cameo, wearing her trademark fedora and dancing with Margot Robbie on the Pan Am flight. She was surprised by Tarantino's detailed knowledge of both 1960s dances and her previous work, and said she personally knew two of the real-life people who are portrayed in the film: Sharon Tate and Jay Sebring, who were both killed in the Tate-LaBianca murders.

Music career
Basil's recording career began in 1966 with a single for A&M Records, which was the title song of the short film Breakaway by artist Bruce Conner. The B-side was "I'm 28" written by Graham Gouldman who later co-founded 10cc. Basil sang, solo, the swinging jazz number "Wham Rebop Boom Bam" in the first season of Saturday Night Live for the January 17, 1976, show with Buck Henry as host. Basil sold out solo shows at The Roxy in Los Angeles in June 1976, and sang the song on The Merv Griffin Show. She guested with The Lockers during the first season of Saturday Night Live and, in later seasons, as a singer and filmmaker, to perform in her urban style Swan Lake. She was signed to Warner Bros. Records at some point in 1976, but never released any material for the label.

In 1982, her single "Mickey" achieved international success. The song is a cover of "Kitty", a 1979 release by the UK band Racey, written by Nicky Chinn and Mike Chapman and produced by the latter. The original song did not include the "Oh Mickey, you're so fine" chant, which Basil added. The video was conceived, directed, and choreographed by Basil for the UK-based label Radialchoice, before the inception of MTV in July 1981. Issued on Chrysalis Records in September 1982 in the US, the song knocked Lionel Richie from No. 1 on the Billboard Hot 100 in December. It topped the chart in Canada where it was issued by Virgin Records. The 45 was quickly certified Gold and in early 1983 reached Platinum status for sales of over 2 million copies in the United States alone. The music video for "Mickey" was one of the most popular early MTV videos. In the video, Basil wore her head cheerleader uniform from Las Vegas High School from which she graduated. During an interview on VH1's "100 Greatest Songs of The 80's", Basil said that she still owns the same cheerleader sweater she wore in the video. In 2009, VH1 ranked "Mickey" Number 6 on its list of the 100 Greatest One Hit Wonders of the '80s. In 2017 she launched an unsuccessful lawsuit against the makers of South Park over their use of the song in parodying Barack Obama's 2008 election win.

For television, Basil has appeared as an actress and featured singer/dancer in many television shows and specials. She co-directed and choreographed two BBC specials with Alan Walsh and Ken Stephenson called "Toni Basil Tape 1" and "Toni Basil Tape 2".

Basil's recording career consists of only two albums. Her first album, 1982's Word of Mouth, included a second Hot 100 single "Shoppin' from A to Z", as well as three songs by Devo, with the group providing the backing track. The track "Space Girls" was a re-recording of a 1974 Devo demo titled "Space Girl Blues" that was later released on Devo's "Hardcore Devo: Volume One". Devo member Gerald Casale and Basil were in a relationship at the time, and Basil had been an early supporter of the group.

Toni Basil (1983), her eponymous second album, yielded a third and final Hot 100 charting single, "Over My Head", which reached No. 4 on the U.S. Dance chart. Her song "Girls Night Out" appeared on the 1986 movie soundtrack Modern Girls. To date, there have been five Toni Basil best of collections released on CD. In 1999, DJ and producer Jason Nevins's dance remix of "Mickey" was a club hit in Europe and Australia.

Basil contributed vocals for the Devo song "The Only One" in 1987, part of the soundtrack of the horror film Slaughterhouse Rock, in which Basil starred. The song was not released until 2000, on the demo compilation Recombo DNA.

Acting career 

Basil began her acting career by appearing in the films Easy Rider and Five Easy Pieces. Some of her other films are The Last Movie (directed by Dennis Hopper), Greaser's Palace (directed by Robert Downey, Sr.), Mother, Jugs & Speed, Village of the Giants, Rockula (with Thomas Dolby) and Slaughterhouse Rock. On TV, she has appeared in episodes of Laverne & Shirley (in which she played the character, Mickie), Dark Justice, and in Baywatch Nights as a fortune teller.

Film making and music videos
Basil directed short art films including Game of the Week, A Dance Film, Out Trip, and The Ping Pong Match.  Predating music videos, these avant garde pieces found a new audience and were exhibited at the Santa Monica Museum of Art, the Getty Museum, and New York University's Grey Art Gallery.  The Los Angeles Times noted Basil's deft editing transformed an ordinary ping pong match into an energetic dance routine.

Basil's Word of Mouth video album was nominated for both a Grammy Award and an MTV Video Music Award.

Basil's late 1960s 8 mm and 16 mm films toured the U.S. with the show "Semina Culture: Wallace Berman and His Circle" in 2007.

Aside from directing her own video for "Mickey", she directed and choreographed the video for Talking Heads' "Once in a Lifetime". The video features lead singer David Byrne against a white background in a style similar to "Mickey".

Awards and accolades
Basil's awards include Hip Hop International's Living Legend Award, a Grammy nomination for Long Form Video ("Word of Mouth") 1983, an Emmy nomination and win for Outstanding Achievement in Choreography for The Smothers Brothers in 1988, two MTV Award nominations, American Choreography Awards: four nominations and two wins including Lifetime Achievement Innovator, and The Los Angeles Theater Ovation: Street Dance Award. Exhibitions include the Museum of Modern Art: Videos, and the Santa Monica Museum of Art: Short Films. She has received platinum and gold discs in the US, United Kingdom, Australia, Canada, Philippines, and France. Her single "Mickey" was installed in the Rock and Roll Hall of Fame as one of the groundbreaking singles of the 1980s. She was given tribute at The Carnival: Choreographer's Ball, Monsters of Hip-Hop Masters of Movement, and in Portraits of America's Great Choreographers. She was featured in the Museum of Modern Art Calendar of Artists and on the cover of Dance Magazine.

On January 25, 2012, Basil presented The Electric Boogaloos with a Lifetime Achievement Award at the 13th anniversary show of The Carnival: Choreographer's Ball for their role in popularizing dance styles such as popping and electric boogie.

Filmography

Discography

Studio albums

Compilation albums 
{| class="wikitable plainrowheaders" style="text-align:center;"
! scope="col" style="width:8em;"| Title
! scope="col" style="width:12em;"| Album details
|-
! scope="row" | The Best of Toni Basil: Mickey & Other Love Songs
|
Released: 1994
Formats: CD
Label: Razor & Tie
|-
! scope="row" | The Best of Toni Basil
|
Released: 1994
Formats: CD, cassette
Label: Tring International PLC
|-
! scope="row" | The Best of Toni Basil: Mickey... And Other Greatest Hits
|
Released: 1994
Formats: CD
Label: Form Records
|-
! scope="row" | Mickey!: The Best of Toni Basil
|
Released: 1994
Formats: CD, cassette
Label: Hallmark Records
|-
! scope="row" | The Very Best of Toni Basil
|
Released: 1997
Formats: CD
Label: Emporio
|-
! scope="row" | Oh Mickey!'
|
Released: 2000
Formats: CD
Label: Snapper Music
|}

 Singles 

Awards and nominations
{| class=wikitable
|-
! Year !! Awards !! Work !! Category !! Result
|-
| 1984
| 'MTV Video Music Awards
| Over My Head| Best Choreography
| 
|-
| 1984
| Grammy Awards
| Word of Mouth''
| Best Video Album
|

References

External links

 
 
 

1943 births
Living people
20th-century American actresses
20th-century American singers
Actresses from Philadelphia
American film actresses
American music video directors
American new wave musicians
American people of Italian descent
American television actresses
American women choreographers
American choreographers
Chrysalis Records artists
Female music video directors
Women new wave singers
Musicians from Philadelphia
Singers from Pennsylvania
20th-century American women singers
Las Vegas High School alumni
21st-century American women